Volker Klimpel (born 27 December 1941) is a German surgeon and medicine historian.

Life 
He was admitted to the medical profession in Erfurt in 1967 and received his doctorate in 1969 with a dissertation under . After working in surgical clinics and polyclinics, he worked under  at the Department of History of Medicine at the Erfurt Medical Academy from 1984 to 1987. Heidel was the first holder of the Chair of History of Medicine at the Medical Academy "Carl Gustav Carus" Dresden from 1987. After the German reunification, Klimpel hired himself out from 1991 to 2005 as an expert assessor at the  Saxony. His fields of work are the history of surgery, literature and medicine, local and personal history and lexicography. Klimpel has been co-author of the biographical encyclopaedia on nursing history Who is who in nursing history (Horst-Peter Wolff with successor Hubert Kolling as editor) since 2008.

Publications 
 Dresdner Ärzte. Hellerau, Dresden 1998.
 Schriftsteller-Ärzte. Pressler, Hürtgenwald 1999.
 Frauen der Medizin. Pressler, Hürtgenwald 2001.
 Berühmte Dresdner. Hellerau, Dresden 2002.
 Politiker-Ärzte. Pressler, Hürtgenwald 2001. .
 Ärzte-Tode. Königshausen & Neumann, Würzburg 2005.
 Lexikon fremdsprachiger Schriftsteller-Ärzte. Peter Lang, Frankfurt 2006.
 Das medizinische Dresden. Hellerau, Dresden 2009.
 Das heilkundige Sachsen. Hellerau, Dresden 2011.
 Asklepios trifft Kalliope. Medizinisch-literarische Begegnungen. WiKu, Cologne 2014.
 Dresdner Ärzte des 20. Jahrhunderts. Historisch-biographisches Lexikon. Hille Verlag, Dresden 2015. .
 Chirurgie in Dresden – Streiflichter ihrer Geschichte. Kaden Verlag, Heidelberg 2017. .
 Im Dunstkreis der Macht. Chirurgen um Hitler. Chirurgische Allgemeine, 18. Jahrgang, 6th issue (2017), .
 Skalpell und Feder: Unbekannte und vergessene Schriftsteller-Ärzte. Weißensee, Berlin 2018. .
 Zugeeignet. Medizinhistorische und andere Erinnerungen aus fünf Jahrzehnten. Kaden Verlag, Heidelberg 2018. .

Further reading 
 Vorgestellt: Langjährige Autoren des „Ärzteblatt Sachsen“ – Dr. med. habil. Volker Klimpel. Curriculum vitae. Ärzteblatt Sachsen I/2015

References

External links 
 

German medical historians
German surgeons
20th-century German physicians
21st-century German physicians
German medical writers
1941 births
Living people
Physicians from Weimar